The 1960 Mid Bedfordshire by-election was held on 16 November 1960 after the incumbent Conservative MP, Alan Lennox-Boyd became an hereditary peer.  It was won by the Conservative candidate Stephen Hastings.

Lennox-Boyd had held the seat in 1959 with a majority of 5,174 votes of the Labour Party's Bryan Magee. At the by-election Magee was again the Labour candidate, while the Liberals also fielded their 1959 candidate, W. G. Matthews.

References

Mid Bedfordshire 1960
Mid Bedfordshire by-election
Mid Bedfordshire
Mid Bedfordshire 1960